Angelo Musi, Jr. (July 25, 1918 – October 19, 2009) was an American professional basketball player.

A 5'9" guard from Temple University, Musi played three seasons (1946–1949) in the Basketball Association of America as a member of the Philadelphia Warriors.  He averaged 8.4 points per game in his BAA career and won a league championship in 1947.

Musi died on October 19, 2009, at his home in Philadelphia.  He was 91 years old.

BAA career statistics

Regular season

Playoffs

See also
 List of shortest players in National Basketball Association history

References

External links

1918 births
2009 deaths
American men's basketball players
Philadelphia Warriors players
Point guards
Temple Owls baseball players
Temple Owls men's basketball players
Basketball players from Philadelphia